Olivier Elima (born 19 May 1983) is a French former professional rugby league footballer who was most recently head coach for the Palau Broncos in the French Elite One Championship. A France international representative forward, he played previously for the Catalans Dragons, Castleford Tigers (Heritage No. 788), Wakefield Trinity Wildcats and the Bradford Bulls.

Background
Elima was born in Nantes, France.

Playing career
Elima has previously played in the centre during the earlier part of his career. The French forward had an excellent season with the Wakefield Trinity Wildcats in 2006.

Elima was named in the France training squad for the 2008 Rugby League World Cup.

Elima had been named in the France squad for the 2008 Rugby League World Cup.

Elima captained France in the 2009 Four Nations tournament, scoring his team's only try in their match against Australia.

Elima captained France in the 2013 Rugby League World Cup Tournament.

Bradford Bulls

Elima confirmed his switch to the Bradford Bulls and signed a two-year contract with the club in September 2010. Statistics do NOT include pre-season friendlies.

2011 – 2011 Season

Elima appeared in two of the three pre-season games. He played against Dewsbury and Wakefield Trinity Wildcats.

Elima featured in eight consecutive games from Round 1 Leeds until Round 8 Harlequins RL. He then appeared in Round 10 against the Salford City Reds to Round 13 Warrington. Elima then featured in thirteen consecutive games from Round 15 against Salford to Round 27 against the Wakefield Trinity Wildcats. He also appeared in the Challenge Cup game against Wigan.

2012 – 2012 Season

Elima missed all the pre-season games due to a knee injury. Elima missed Rounds 1–6 due to an injury. He returned in round 7 to face St. Helens. He was suspended for Round 8. He featured in eleven consecutive games from Round 9 Hull F.C. to Round 19 against Wigan. Elima also featured in Round 21 against Leeds. He was injured for Rounds 22–25. Elima featured in Round 26 Hull F.C. and Round 27 against the Catalans Dragons. He also featured in the Challenge Cup against Doncaster and Warrington. It was later announced that Elima had signed a two-year deal with former club the Catalans Dragons.

Coaching career

Palau XIII Broncos
He was appointed coach of Palau Broncos in 2017. On 23 December 2020 it was reported that he had been sacked by Palau XIII Broncos after their poor start to the Elite One Championship season

References

External links

 Olivier Elima Official Website
 Super League profile
 Olivier Elima Wildcats Profile
 Elima pledges future to Wildcats
 Job's a good 'un!
 Out of the box!
 Reds mauled by Tigers
 Olivier Elima interview at wakefieldwildcats.co.uk
  news about fiancée

1983 births
Living people
Bradford Bulls players
Castleford Tigers players
Catalans Dragons players
France national rugby league team captains
France national rugby league team players
French rugby league players
Palau Broncos coaches
Palau Broncos players
Rugby league second-rows
Wakefield Trinity players